Sydney Dickinson (17 August 1906 – 2 February 1984) was an English footballer who played at half-back for Nottingham Forest, Mansfield Town, Bradford Park Avenue, Port Vale, Lincoln City, and Grantham. Football historian Jeff Kent described his tackling abilities as "tenacious".

Career
Dickinson played for Dale Rovers, Nottingham Forest, Mansfield Town and Bradford Park Avenue, before being signed to Port Vale in November 1933 for "a substantial fee". Despite scoring goals against both Bradford clubs at Valley Parade and the Horsfall Stadium, he was only utilized in twelve Second Division games before being released from The Old Recreation Ground at the end of the season. He moved on to Lincoln City and Grantham.

Career statistics
Source:

References

1906 births
1984 deaths
Footballers from Nottingham
English footballers
Association football midfielders
Nottingham Forest F.C. players
Mansfield Town F.C. players
Bradford (Park Avenue) A.F.C. players
Port Vale F.C. players
Lincoln City F.C. players
Grantham Town F.C. players
English Football League players